Patrick Morris (born February 13, 1995) is an American football center who is a free agent. He played college football at TCU and was signed as an undrafted free agent by the Pittsburgh Steelers in 2018. He has also played for the Denver Broncos and Tennessee Titans.

Professional career

Pittsburgh Steelers
Morris signed with the Pittsburgh Steelers as an undrafted free agent on April 28, 2018. He was waived on September 1, 2018 and was signed to the practice squad the next day. He signed a reserve/future contract on December 31, 2018.

On August 31, 2019, Morris was waived by the Steelers and signed to the practice squad the next day. He was promoted to the active roster on November 21, 2019. He was waived on December 2, 2019.

Denver Broncos
On December 3, 2019, Morris was claimed off waivers by the Denver Broncos. He was waived on September 5, 2020, and was signed to the practice squad the following day. He was elevated to the active roster on October 31 for the team's week 8 game against the Los Angeles Chargers, and reverted to the practice squad after the game. He was placed on the practice squad/injured list on November 6, 2020, after suffering an arm injury against the Chargers. He signed a reserve/future contract on January 5, 2021. On July 27, Morris was released by the Broncos.

Tennessee Titans
On July 30, 2021, Morris signed with the Tennessee Titans. He was waived on August 6, 2021.

References

External links
Texas Christian Horned Frogs bio

1995 births
Living people
American football centers
TCU Horned Frogs football players
Pittsburgh Steelers players
Players of American football from Texas
Sportspeople from Denton, Texas
Denver Broncos players
Tennessee Titans players